West Ham, a United Football Club, managed to reach the semi-final of the Cup Winners Cup losing 5–2 on aggregate to Borussia Dortmund.

The previous month West Ham lost the League Cup Final after leading in the first leg, to West Brom.

Bobby Moore managed to lift one trophy later that summer as fellow Hammers Geoff Hurst and Martin Peters secured England's World Cup triumph, with goals against West Germany.

Johnny Byrne was also in Alf Ramsey's 28 man England squad which assembled at Lilleshall on 6 June 1966.

1965-66
English football clubs 1965–66 season
1965 sports events in London
1966 sports events in London